The streak-breasted bulbul (Hypsipetes siquijorensis) is a songbird species in the bulbul family, Pycnonotidae.

It is endemic to the Philippines being found in the Visayas on the islands of Tablas Island, Siquijor, Cebu and Romblon where its natural habitat is tropical moist lowland forest and tropical moist shrubland. It is threatened by habitat loss and hunting.

Description and taxonomy 

EBird describes the bird as "A medium-sized bird of foothill forest and edge as well as more open wooded areas. Fairly large for a bulbul. Dark brown above with a pale belly and a warm brown chest and throat with pale streaking. Note brown cheek and black crown that can be raised into a spiky crest. Similar to Philippine Bulbul, but larger, with a longer bill, a black crown, and a paler throat and chest. Voice consists of rather unpleasant grating chatters and harsh downslurred squeals."  However, this description mostly refers to the  siquijorensis sub-species (potentially a split). The other two sub-species have much lighter colored appearances and no spiky crown. 

The streak-breasted bulbul was originally described in the genus Iole and later placed in the genus Ixos before being re-classified to the genus Hypsipetes in 2010. Alternate names for the streak-breasted bulbul include the mottle-breasted bulbul and slaty-crowned bulbul.

Subspecies 
Three subspecies are currently recognized: It has been proposed that each should be elevated to the full species level with each having different calls and considerable differences in appearances. 
 Romblon bulbul (H. s. cinereiceps) - (Bourns & Worcester, 1894): Originally described as a separate species in the genus Iole. Found on Tablas and Romblon. Gray spiky crown and overall appearance with a large bill.
 Cebu bulbul (H. s. monticola) - (Bourns & Worcester, 1894): Originally described as a separate species in the genus Iole. Alternatively named the Cebu slaty-crowned bulbul. Found on Cebu. White throat and overall paler appearance. Thought extinct until its rediscovery in 1996.
 Siquijor bulbul (H. s. siquijorensis) - (Steere, 1890): Found on Siquijor. Slightly larger with a spiky black crest.

Habitat and conservation status 
It is found in tropical lowland moist primary and secondary forest. It is able to tolerate degraded habitat provided there is nearby forest but occurs in lower densities in these areas.

IUCN has assessed this bird as endangered with population estimates being 2,500 to 9,999 mature individuals and continuing to decrease. Although it can tolerate less than ideal forest, this species' main threat is habitat loss with wholesale clearance of forest habitats as a result of logging, agricultural conversion and mining activities occurring within the range. Siquijor, Cebu and Tablas Island are some of the most deforested islands with just 8 km2 of forest remaining on Siquijor and 15km2  on Cebu. It appears to face interspecies competition from the Yellow-vented bulbul and the Philippine bulbul.

Conservation actions proposed include: the promotion of improved management of the existing reserves to prevent further habitat deterioration on Siquijor, Cebu and Romblon; the designation of further protected areas as appropriate, particularly on Tablas Island; the promotion of forest restoration and regeneration on Tablas Island; and on Cebu, investigation into the potential for targeted conservation, including captive breeding, of the subspecies monticola.

References

 Gregory, Steven M. (2000): Nomenclature of the Hypsipetes Bulbuls (Pycnonotidae). Forktail 16: 164–166. PDF fulltext
 Moyle, Robert G. & Marks, Ben D. (2006): Phylogenetic relationships of the bulbuls (Aves: Pycnonotidae) based on mitochondrial and nuclear DNA sequence data. Mol. Phylogenet. Evol. 40(3): 687–695.  (HTML abstract)
 Pasquet, Éric; Han, Lian-Xian; Khobkhet, Obhas & Cibois, Alice (2001): Towards a molecular systematics of the genus Criniger, and a preliminary phylogeny of the bulbuls (Aves, Passeriformes, Pycnonotidae). Zoosystema 23(4): 857–863. PDF fulltext

streak-breasted bulbul
Birds of Cebu
Endemic birds of the Philippines
streak-breasted bulbul
Taxa named by Joseph Beal Steere
Taxonomy articles created by Polbot